John A. Lovely (November 18, 1843 – January 28, 1908) was an American lawyer and jurist.

Born in Burlington, Vermont, Lovely was admitted to the Wisconsin bar in Milwaukee, Wisconsin, in 1866. He then practiced law in Watertown, Wisconsin. In 1867, Lovely moved to Albert Lea, Minnesota and continued to practice law. From 1869 to 1874, Lovely served as county attorney for Freeborn County, Minnesota. Lovely served on the Minnesota Supreme Court from 1900 to 1905. He died at his home in Albert Lea, Minnesota.

Notes

1843 births
1908 deaths
Politicians from Burlington, Vermont
People from Albert Lea, Minnesota
Politicians from Watertown, Wisconsin
Minnesota lawyers
Wisconsin lawyers
Justices of the Minnesota Supreme Court
19th-century American judges